"The Spark" is a single by the Dutch DJ and record producer Afrojack, featuring vocals by American singer Spree Wilson. It was released on 11 October 2013, through Island Records, as the lead single from his debut studio album Forget the World (2014). 

It was re-released in November and entered the UK Singles Chart at number 17. The song was also featured on the promos for the MTV EMA 2013 on 10 November. One of the locations in the video is Parisian Palace, by Nico Santucci.

Music video
A music video to accompany the release of "The Spark" was first released on YouTube on 11 October 2013.

Track listing

Charts

Weekly charts

Year-end charts

Certifications

References

2013 singles
2013 songs
Afrojack songs
Songs written by Afrojack
Songs written by Mark Maxwell (producer)